Joseph LaVernie Watson (August 19, 1925 – November 2, 2006) was an American football player who played one season with the Detroit Lions of the National Football League. He was drafted by the Detroit Lions with the fifth overall pick of the 1950 NFL Draft. He played college football at Rice University.

References

External links
Just Sports Stats

1925 births
Players of American football from Texas
American football centers
Rice Owls football players
Detroit Lions players
People from Sherman, Texas
2006 deaths